Patrick Buisson (born 1949 in Paris) is a conservative French essayist, journalist and political advisor. He was a journalist for Minute, Valeurs Actuelles and Le Crapouillot as well as La Chaîne Info. He has written several books about Vichy France, the Algerian War and the Indochina War. The founder and co-owner of Publifact, a polling agency, he was a key advisor to former President Nicolas Sarkozy from 2006 to 2012, during which time he surreptitiously recorded private conversations he had with the president. He is the co-presenter of Historiquement show, a television program on Histoire, a subsidiary of the TF1 Group, which he chairs.

Early life
Patrick Buisson was born on April 19, 1949 in Paris, France. His father, Georges Buisson, an engineer for Électricité de France, was a member of the Camelots du Roi, and later the Rally for the Republic. His parents divorced when he was five years old, and he lived with his mother. Together, they demonstrated for the Hungarian Revolution of 1956, which attempted to rid Hungaria of Soviet influence. When he was twelve years old, he went to live with his father.

He was educated at the Lycée Pasteur in Neuilly-sur-Seine, near Paris. He received a PhD in History from Paris West University Nanterre La Défense, where his thesis supervisor was Raoul Girardet.

Career
Buisson started his career as a history teacher. In 1981, he started writing for Minute. He later wrote for Valeurs Actuelles. He also wrote for Le Crapouillot.

Buisson has written several books. One of his earliest books were about the Organisation armée secrète and Jean-Marie Le Pen. He also expressed his enthusiasm for order and hierarchies. Additionally, he wrote a book about Sacha Guitry and co-wrote a book about Léo Ferré. Later, he wrote history books about the Algerian War, the Indochina War and Vichy France. His book about eroticism during Vichy France, which suggests many French women had sexual intercourse with German invaders during World War II, was adapted as a film entitled Love and Sex under Nazi Occupation in 2011.

Buisson served as a political advisor to Philippe de Villiers in the 1990s and early 2000s. He served as a political advisor to President Nicolas Sarkozy from 2006 to 2012. He played a key role in Sarkozy's victory during the 2007 presidential election. He suggested renegotiating the Évian Accords, which gives special visas to Algerians when they visit France, but Sarkozy turned down the idea. He has been described by Le Monde as "one of the Fifth Republic's most influential advisors."

Buisson founded Publifact, a polling firm, in Lyon in 1982. He owns 58%. In 2008, the firm received 1,082,400 Euros from the Élysée for various polls and reports. In 2009, Buisson received 10,000 Euros each month as a consultant.

In February 2014, Le Point revealed that Buisson had surreptitiously recorded private conversations he had with President Sarkozy. A month later, in March 2014, Le Canard enchaîné published the transcripts. Buisson's son, Georges, denied being the one who leaked them.

Buisson was a TV journalist for La Chaîne Info. He was also the co-creator of 100% Politique, a TV program, with David Pujadas, and Politiquement Show, another TV program, with Michel Field. He has served as the Chairman of Histoire, a TV channel which is a subsidiary of the TF1 Group, since 2007. His contract was renewed in 2015. He presents Historiquement show, a history TV program, with Michel Field.

Buisson received the Legion of Honour on September 24, 2007.

Personal life
Buisson is a Roman Catholic "by tradition," and attends the Latin Mass.

He has a son, Georges Buisson, who is co-owner of Publifact and works for the Histoire TV channel with his father. In June 2015, he published a book about his father, entitled L'Ennemi.

On 21 January 2022, Buisson and three co-defendants, former Sarkozy chief of staff Claude Gueant, former cabinet director Emmanuelle Mignon and former pollster and consultant Pierre Giacometti, were found guilty of polling fraud involving allegations that they misused public money while ordering public opinion polls worth a combined 7.5 million euros ($8.7 million) during the course of Sarkozy's presidency between 2017 and 2012. Buisson would receive no jail time in his sentence was instead handed a two-year suspended sentence and a 150,000 euro fine.

Bibliography
OAS : Histoire de la résistance française en Algérie (with Pascal Gauchon, Bièvres: Jeune Pied-Noir, 1984, 168 pages).
L'Album Le Pen (with Alain Renault, Écully: Intervalles, 1984, 155 pages).
Avec le temps / C'est l'histoire d'un métamec  (with Léo Ferré, illustrated by Hubert Grooteclaes, Paris: Éditions du Chêne, 1995, 149 pages).
Sacha Guitry et ses femmes (Paris: Éditions Albin Michel, 1996, 321 pages).
Vichy ou les infortunes de la vertu (Paris: Éditions Albin Michel, 2008, 570 pages).
De la grande prostituée à la revanche des mâles (Paris: Éditions Albin Michel, 2008, 521 pages).
La Grande Guerre, 1914-1918 (with Jean-Pascal Soudagne, prefaced by Max Gallo, Paris: XO éditions, 351 pages).
La Guerre d'Algérie (prefaced by Michel Déon, illustrated by Marc Flament, Paris: Éditions Albin Michel, 2009, 271 pages).
La Guerre d'Indochine (prefaced by Pierre Schoendoerffer, Paris: Éditions Albin Michel, 2009, 255 pages).
L'Occupation intime (Paris: Éditions Albin Michel, 2011, 319 pages).
Le Paris de Céline (Paris: Éditions Albin Michel, 2012).
La Cause du peuple (Paris: Perrin, 2016).

References

1949 births
Living people
Writers from Paris
Union for a Popular Movement politicians
The Strong Right
French essayists
French journalists
French television presenters
University of Paris alumni
Chevaliers of the Légion d'honneur